KVMC (1320 AM, Real Country) is a radio station broadcasting a country music music format. Licensed to Colorado City, Texas, United States, the station is currently owned by Pete Garcia, Jr., through licensee Extreme Media, LLC, and features programming from Citadel Broadcasting.

References

External links

VMC
Country radio stations in the United States
VMC